KWRU (1300 kHz) is a commercial AM radio station in Fresno, California.  The station broadcasts a Punjabi language radio format of music, news and talk.  It is owned by Punjabi American Media LLC. Most California Sikhs /Punjabi  live in the north and Central Valley, where they've had a presence for more than 100 years. "Central California is probably the most densely populated Sikh/Punjabi community.
KWRU carries the Punjabi Radio USA network, based in San Jose, California and heard in about a dozen West Coast cities.

History
The station first signed on in October 1947.  Through the 1960s and 70s, it was KYNO, a popular Top 40 outlet, owned by Gene Chenault and programmed by Bill Drake, pioneers in the "Boss Radio" sound that sparked Top 40 stations in Los Angeles, San Francisco, San Diego and other cities.

In 1980 the station was sold to Spanish Catholic Radio of Fresno, offering Spanish-language religious programming.

KWRU formerly aired programming from Radio Vida Abundante, a Spanish-language Evangelical Christian network.  The station was owned by Multicultural Radio Broadcasting Licensee, LLC.  Multicultural Broadcasting, owned by Arthur Liu of New York City, sold the station to Punjabi American Media in September 2016.

References

External links
FCC History Cards for KWRU
Punjabi Radio USA
Punjabi Radio USA Facebook Page

WRU
WRU
Mass media in Fresno, California
Mass media in Fresno County, California
Mass media in Merced County, California
Radio stations established in 1947
1947 establishments in California